Ike McFadden (born June 20, 1977) is an American video game producer and former television and film producer and public relations agent. He has produced video games featuring Hulk Hogan, David Hasselhoff, The Blues Brothers, and James Dean. Together with partners Eric Bischoff and Jason Hervey, he founded the game production company MX Digital.

Founder and director of MX

In 2013, Bischoff-Hervey Entertainment, Eric Bischoff and Jason Hervey acquired an ownership interest with McFadden in MX Digital, a company that produces and distributes online and mobile games in Europe and North America.

Among the company's first games was "Hulk Hogan's Hulkamania", starring wrestler and actor Hulk Hogan.  The game was co-funded by UK television company Endemol Shine Group and debuted on Sky Vegas in November 2012.

Their next game, "The Hoff", featuring actor-singer David Hasselhoff, was released widely in Europe in February 2013.

In early 2014, McFadden and Bischoff's online-gaming company announced a deal with actor Dan Aykroyd to launch a Blues Brothers themed online casino game in Europe.

McFadden said in a 2015 interview with IGaming Intelligence, "As the industry has matured it has become more and more like traditional media, you can have a bigger opening weekend [for a game] and then it may drop off faster in terms of performance, so you have a shorter time period to make the money you are going to make".

In late 2014, MX Digital launched games on Facebook, under the title "MX Casino".  Slot-machine-style games were ported as non-gambling versions playable upon launch as a Facebook app.  Games included "socialized" versions of "Hulk Hogan's Hulkamania", as well as a similarly Facebook versions for David Hasslehoff's, "The Hoff".  Also debuting in October of that year were several new themed games, featuring celebrities such as Dennis Rodman, James Dean and Chuck Norris.

Later activities
In 2019, McFadden launched the podcast series "Like Ike" on YouTube featuring popular internet influencers such as controversial rapper and author Zuby

References

1977 births
Living people
American film producers
American public relations people
American video game producers